The buccopharyngeal fascia is a fascia of the pharynx. It represents the posterior portion of the pretracheal fascia. It covers the superior pharyngeal constrictor muscles, and buccinator.

Structure 
The buccopharyngeal fascia is a thin lamina given off from the pretracheal fascia.

It is attached to the prevertebral fascia by loose connective tissue, with the retropharyngeal space found between them. It may also be attached to the alar fascia posteriorly at C3 and C6 levels.

The buccopharyngeal fascia envelops the superior pharyngeal constrictor muscles. It closely invests the constrictor muscles of the pharynx. It is continued forward from the constrictor pharyngis superior over the pterygomandibular raphe to cover the buccinator. The thyroid gland wraps around the trachea and oesophagus anterior to the buccopharyngeal fascia, so that the lateral parts of the thyroid gland border it. The buccopharyngeal fascia runs parallel to the medial aspect of the carotid sheath.

Additional images

See also 

 Pharyngobasilar fascia

References

External links
  - "Pharynx: The Pharyngeal Constrictor Muscles"
 

Fascial spaces of the head and neck